The 10th Parliament of Upper Canada was opened 8 January 1829.  Elections in Upper Canada had been held in July 1828.  All sessions were held at York, Upper Canada.  This parliament was dissolved 8 September 1830 on the announcement of the death of King George IV.

The House of Assembly of the 10th Parliament of Upper Canada had two sessions 8 January 1829 to 6 March 1830:

Both the House and Parliament sat at the old York Court House on King Street.

See also
Legislative Council of Upper Canada
Executive Council of Upper Canada
Legislative Assembly of Upper Canada
Lieutenant Governors of Upper Canada, 1791–1841
Historical federal electoral districts of Canada
List of Ontario provincial electoral districts

References

Further reading 
Handbook of Upper Canadian Chronology, Frederick H. Armstrong, Toronto : Dundurn Press, 1985. 

Parliaments of Upper Canada
1829 establishments in Upper Canada
1830 disestablishments in Upper Canada